Ball Bluff Township is a township in Aitkin County, Minnesota, United States. The population was 270 as of the 2020 census.  The 2021 population estimate is 274.

History
Ball Bluff is a corruption of Bald Bluff, a glacial morainic drift with a treeless, grassy top. It was incorporated May 26, 1900.

Geography

Major highways
  Minnesota State Highway 65
  Minnesota State Highway 200

Lakes
 Hay Lake
 Little Ball Bluff Lake (north quarter)
 Vanduse Lake

Adjacent townships
 Sago Township, Itasca County (north)
 Wawina Township, Itasca County (northeast)
 Cornish Township (south)
 Verdon Township (southwest)

Cemeteries
The township contains Ball Bluff Cemetery.

Demographics
As of the census of 2000, there were 300 people, 121 households, and 86 families residing in the township.  The population density was 8.9 people per square mile (3.4/km2).  There were 207 housing units at an average density of 6.1/sq mi (2.4/km2).  The racial makeup of the township was 98.67% White, 0.67% Native American, and 0.67% from two or more races.

There were 121 households, out of which 28.9% had children under the age of 18 living with them, 62.0% were married couples living together, 3.3% had a female householder with no husband present, and 28.9% were non-families. 25.6% of all households were made up of individuals, and 8.3% had someone living alone who was 65 years of age or older.  The average household size was 2.48 and the average family size was 2.92.

In the township the population was spread out, with 22.7% under the age of 18, 4.7% from 18 to 24, 25.3% from 25 to 44, 31.3% from 45 to 64, and 16.0% who were 65 years of age or older.  The median age was 43 years. For every 100 females, there were 102.7 males.  For every 100 females age 18 and over, there were 101.7 males.

The median income for a household in the township was $33,750, and the median income for a family was $45,625. Males had a median income of $36,667 versus $21,500 for females. The per capita income for the township was $16,602.  About 19.6% of families and 28.4% of the population were below the poverty line, including 47.9% of those under the age of eighteen and 10.5% of those 65 or over.

References
 United States National Atlas
 United States Census Bureau 2007 TIGER/Line Shapefiles
 United States Board on Geographic Names (GNIS)

Townships in Aitkin County, Minnesota
Townships in Minnesota